Dimetotiazine (INN) is a phenothiazine drug used for the treatment of migraine. It is a serotonin antagonist and histamine antagonist.

Synthesis

The Sandmeyer reaction on o-(4-Dimethylaminosulfonyl-2-nitrophenylthio)aniline [5510-56-5] (1) gives 4-[(2-Bromophenyl)-thio]-N,N'-dimethyl-3-nitro-benzenesulfonamide [5510-58-7] (2). The reduction of the nitro group gives 3-Amino-4-((2-bromophenyl)thio)-N,N-dimethylbenzenesulfonamide [5592-64-3] (3). Goldberg reaction gives the chief precursor, 2-Dimethylaminosulfonylphenthiazine [1090-78-4] (4). Alkylation of this with 1-chloro-N,N-dimethylpropan-2-amine [53309-35-6] (5) give Dimethothiazine (6).

References 

Antimigraine drugs
H1 receptor antagonists
Phenothiazines
Serotonin receptor antagonists
Sulfonamides